Mohammad Forouzandeh is an Iranian politician and security figure. He is currently member of the Expediency Discernment Council 

He was the former head of the Bonyad-e Mostazafen va Janbazan (Foundation of the Oppressed and Disabled). His tenure as head of the foundation began on December 3, 2004, and was renewed for another five years on December 2, 2009. He resigned from his post on July 22, 2014, and was replaced by Mohammad Saeedikia. He served as chief of staff of the Revolutionary Guard from late 1987 to 1989 and later as Defense Minister of Iran.

References

1960 births
Living people
People from Tehran
Members of the Expediency Discernment Council
Defence ministers of Iran